Green Grove is a town in Clark County in the U.S. state of Wisconsin. The population was 756 at the 2010 census, down from 902 at the 2000 census. The unincorporated communities of Atwood and Bright are located in the town.

Geography
The town of Green Grove is in northeastern Clark County. It is bordered to the northwest by the city of Owen and at its northeast corner by the village of Curtiss.

Demographics
As of the census of 2000, there were 902 people, 225 households, and 177 families residing in the town. The population density was 24.7 people per square mile (9.5/km2). There were 236 housing units at an average density of 6.5 per square mile (2.5/km2). The racial makeup of the town was 98.89% White, 0.22% Native American, 0.22% Asian, and 0.67% from two or more races. Hispanic or Latino of any race were 0.44% of the population.

There were 225 households, out of which 39.1% had children under the age of 18 living with them, 68.9% were married couples living together, 5.8% had a female householder with no husband present, and 20.9% were non-families. 16.0% of all households were made up of individuals, and 8.9% had someone living alone who was 65 years of age or older. The average household size was 3.11 and the average family size was 3.57.

In the town, the population was spread out, with 27.4% under the age of 18, 6.2% from 18 to 24, 21.7% from 25 to 44, 18.7% from 45 to 64, and 25.9% who were 65 years of age or older. The median age was 41 years. For every 100 females, there were 96.1 males. For every 100 females age 18 and over, there were 96.7 males.

The median income for a household in the town was $37,667, and the median income for a family was $41,023. Males had a median income of $32,120 versus $19,063 for females. The per capita income for the town was $14,067. About 10.4% of families and 13.1% of the population were below the poverty line, including 18.7% of those under age 18 and 14.8% of those age 65 or over.

References

Towns in Wisconsin
Towns in Clark County, Wisconsin